The Institute of Archaeology and Art History is an academic research institution in Cluj-Napoca, Romania.

History 
In the early days of 1990 began the process of rebirth of the Romanian Academy, a national institution of reference for Romanian culture and science, founded in 1866. Former  Romanian Academy research institutes, temporarily affiliated with universities, have returned to the  original jurisdiction.

The Institute of Archaeology and Art History of the Romanian Academy, established on March 3, 1990 through a government decision, together with the Institute of History "George Bariț" is continuing  the traditions of scientific and research developed in 1920s by the
Romanian National Historical Institute, the Romanian Institute of Classical Studies and the Romanian Art History Seminar.

See also 
Lovers of Cluj-Napoca
Romanian Academy
 Vasile Pârvan Institute of Archaeology
 Iași Institute of Archaeology

Notes

References 

 Enciclopedia istoriografiei românești, Editura Științifică și Enciclopedică, București, 1978, p. 366-367.
 Scientific  Research in the Romanian Academy Institutes, București, 2006, p. 72-74.

Further reading 

 Enciclopedia istoriografiei românești, Editura Științifică și Enciclopedică, București, 1978, p. 366-367.
 Scientific  Research in the Romanian Academy Institutes, București, 2006, p. 72-74.

External links 
 Site Institut 
 Catedra de Istorie Antică şi Arheologie la UBB

Archaeology of Romania
Organizations based in Cluj-Napoca
Institutes of the Romanian Academy
Archaeological research institutes in Romania